Eichbach is a small river of Hesse and of Bavaria, Germany. It is the right headwater of the Weibersbach in Albstadt.

See also

List of rivers of Hesse
List of rivers of Bavaria

Rivers of Hesse
Rivers of Bavaria
Rivers of the Spessart
Rivers of Germany